Wu Gorge, sometimes called Great Gorge, is the second gorge of the Three Gorges system on the Yangtze River, People's Republic of China. Formed by the Wu River, it stretches  from Wushan to Guandukou, and is located downstream of Qutang Gorge and upstream of Xiling Gorge.  The gorge straddles the boundary between Wushan County of Chongqing Municipality (formerly part of Sichuan Province) and Badong County, Hubei Province.

The Gorge has been known as the Wu Gorge since at least the Three Kingdoms Period, when it was recorded in the geographical treatise Shui Jing Zhu.  In 589 AD, General Lü Zhongsu of the Chen Dynasty stationed troops in the Wu and Xiling Gorges in an attempt to stop the advancing Sui Dynasty armies.  Tang Dynasty poet Yang Jiong wrote a classical poem entitled "Passing Wu Gorge".

The mountains on both sides of the Yangtze, through which the river cuts the Wu Gorge, are known as the Wu Mountains (巫山, Wū Shān).

References
Zhongguo Gujin Diming Dacidian 中国古今地名大词典 (2005). Shanghai: Shanghai Cishu Chubanshe 上海辞书出版社. Page 1456.

Canyons and gorges of China
Landforms of Hubei
Landforms of Chongqing